Gony may refer to:

People
 Geordy Gony (born 1994), New Caledonian football player
 Manpreet Gony (born 1984), Indian cricket player

Places
 Gony Point